The World Backgammon Federation (WBGF), formerly the European Backgammon Federation (EUBGF) until 2018, is the international body established to support and promote the tables game of backgammon worldwide.

Their functions include the regulation of competition rules worldwide, the assessment and ranking of players and the establishment of regional governing bodies. Among their objectives is the legal recognition of backgammon as a mind sport at national and international levels.

The WBGF is based in Schwaz, Austria.

Members 
The national backgammon organisations of the following countries are members of the WBGF: Argentina, Australia, Austria, Belgium, Canada, Cyprus, Czechia, Denmark, Egypt, France, Germany, Greece, Hungary, Japan, Iceland, Ireland, Italy, Montenegro, New Zealand, Norway, Romania, Serbia, South Africa, Sweden, Switzerland, Turkey, United Arab Republic, United Kingdom, and the United States

See also

List of world backgammon champions

References

External links
 

International sports organizations
Sports organizations established in 2018
Backgammon
Sports organisations of Austria